A selective androgen receptor degrader or downregulator (SARD) is a type of drug which interacts with the androgen receptor (AR) such that it causes the AR to be degraded and thus downregulated. They are under investigation for the treatment of prostate cancer and other androgen-dependent conditions.

As of 2017, dimethylcurcumin (ASC-J9), a SARD, is under development for the treatment of acne vulgaris.

See also
 Androgen deprivation therapy

References

Antiandrogens
Hormonal antineoplastic drugs